Arthrochilus oreophilus, commonly known as the untidy elbow orchid, is a flowering plant in the orchid family (Orchidaceae) and is endemic to near the tip of Cape York in Queensland. It has two or three leaves at its base and up to seven pale green, insect-like flowers with reddish glands on its labellum.

Description
Arthrochilus apectus is a terrestrial, perennial, deciduous, sympodial herb with an underground tuber which produces daughter tubers on the end of root-like stolons.
The petals and lateral sepals turn backwards against the ovary. Flowering occurs from November to February.

Taxonomy and naming
Arthrochilus apectus was first formally described in 2004 by David Jones from a specimen collected in the Heathlands Reserve near the tip of Cape York. The description was published in The Orchadian. The specific epithet (apectus) is from the Ancient Greek word apektos meaning "uncombed" or "unkempt".

Distribution and habitat
The untidy elbow orchid grows in forest on the northern part of the Cape York Peninsula.

Ecology
As with other Arthrochilus orchids, A. apectus is pollinated by male thynnid wasps of the genus Arthrothynnus although the species involved is not known. It also reproduces asexually by producing new tubers.

References 

apectus
Plants described in 2004
Orchids of Queensland